20 De Colección is a compilation album by Colombian singer/musician Carlos Vives released on June 21, 1994. The collection was released as part of the Sony International 20 De Colección series. 

The album is one of many Vives "hits" collections that appeared shortly after the singer's breakthrough Clasicos de la Provincia, exposing fans unfamiliar with Vives's earlier work. Vives's previous pop/ballad albums No Podrás Escapar de Mí and Al Centro de la Ciudad, which met with lukewarm reception, are both compiled here in their entirety, in original song order. The last two tracks come from the soundtrack Escalona: Un Canto a la Vida, which marked the beginning of Vive's signature vallenato sound.

Track listing

Carlos Vives compilation albums
1994 compilation albums
Spanish-language compilation albums
Philips Records albums